

Oscar George "Ox" Eckhardt (December 23, 1901 – April 22, 1951) was an outfielder for the Boston Braves and Brooklyn Dodgers. Eckhardt holds the known all-time professional baseball record for batting average, counting both major and minor league stats: .365.

(Ty Cobb holds the major league record, .366, but Cobb's minor league average of .304 lowers his total professional-ball average to .364, second behind Eckhardt. Ike Boone holds the minor league record, .370, but his major league average of .321 also lowers his total professional-ball average to .364 (just behind Cobb if their averages are expanded to further digits). Eckhardt hit .192 in the major leagues, but in just 52 at bats, so his known minor league average of .366 was lowered just one point.)

In spite of his outstanding ability to hit for average, Eckhardt – a poor fielder who lacked much home run power – was never able to establish himself in the major leagues. He spent a few years as a coach and assistant professor at West Texas State Teachers College (now West Texas A&M University), so he was already 26 when he started seriously playing minor league ball, which is older than the average age of major league debuts. He was invited to spring training by the Detroit Tigers in 1929, 1930, and 1931, but he didn't make the team. He played in spring training for the Boston Braves 1932, and did go north with the Braves, but was sent back to the minors after eight at bats as a pinch hitter. The next year, 1933, he hit .414 for the San Francisco Missions, which is the PCL (Pacific Coast League) record. In 1935, he again won the PCL batting title, edging out 20-year-old Joe DiMaggio, .399 to .398.  

This finally earned him a slot on a major league club, the 1936 Brooklyn Dodgers, with a chance to win a job as a regular. But Eckhardt was 36 years old by then, was still a poor fielder with little power, and in ten starts hit just .182 in 44 at bats. He was sent back to the minors, never to return.

Eckhardt also played halfback and quarterback for the Texas Longhorns, and professionally as a halfback in 11 games for the New York Giants of the National Football League. He intercepted a pass in the Longhorns 16–0 upset win over Vanderbilt in 1923.

Eckhardt was inducted into the Pacific Coast League Hall of Fame in 2003.

Head coaching record

Notes

References

External links
 
 

1901 births
1951 deaths
American football fullbacks
American football halfbacks
American football quarterbacks
Major League Baseball right fielders
Boston Braves players
Brooklyn Dodgers players
New York Giants players
Texas Longhorns baseball players
Texas Longhorns football players
West Texas A&M Buffaloes football coaches
Austin Senators players
Amarillo Texans players
Beaumont Exporters players
Dallas Rebels players
Indianapolis Indians players
Memphis Chickasaws players
Mission Reds players
Seattle Indians players
Toledo Mud Hens players
Wichita Larks players
People from Yorktown, Texas
Players of American football from Texas
Baseball players from Texas